Constructions Mécaniques de Normandie (CMN) is a French shipyard located at Cherbourg. It employs approximately four hundred employees covering the various specialities required for the construction of luxury yachts and naval ships.

Since its foundation in 1945, the shipyard has delivered over 350 vessels. It is part of the holding company, Abu Dhabi MAR, which is steered by the Emirate of Abu Dhabi.

History
The shipyard was founded in 1945 by the French aircraft constructor, Félix Amiot in Cherbourg, France. The first vessel built by CMN was a wooden trawler which was launched on 23 June 1948 and soon diversified its products to minesweepers, coast guard vessels, fishing boats, barges, Patrol Boats and Fast Attack Crafts.

In the 1960s, the shipyard specialized in building vessels with the CMN patented "glued laminated wood technique", especially the Mine Sweepers for the French and German Navies. One of its major minesweeper series was the well-known CIRCÉ class Minehunters (the first one was launched on 15 December 1970, the following four between 1971 and 1972). The glued laminated technique was the best answer to the ship qualities in terms of non-magnetism, noise 's absorption or noise's reflecting.

From 1967, Félix Amiot diversified CMN's offerings with Fast Attack Crafts with a wood-cored laminated hull. The incident that marked the beginning of a new class of fast attack craft in shipbuilding - La Combattante I, was the sinking of the Israeli destroyer INS Eilat on October 21, 1967  by two Egyptian Komar missile boats, as she sailed in international waters off Port Said.

In 1962, Lürssen of Germany signed an agreement to supply Israel with twelve of the Jaguar class fast attack craft vessels. After the delivery of three of the twelve missile boats in 1964, Germany had to renounce the agreement owing to political pressures from Arab Nations. The Germans, however, agreed that the boats could be constructed elsewhere and CMN was chosen to construct the remaining nine, which would be of La Combattante I class ( Sa'ar-1-class Israeli Navy designate) fast attack crafts.

During the 1970s, the Bundesmarine (German Federal Navy), ordered 20  La Combattante II fast attack crafts. The Tiger class fast attack craft is a modification of the French La Combattante II design.

In 1992 the shipyard was taken over by Iskandar Safa and in 2007, it becomes a part of Abu Dhabi MAR.

Operations
CMN has around 400 employees and is part of the holding company, Abu Dhabi MAR, which is steered by the Emirate of Abu Dhabi. Its sister companies are ADMShipyards, Nobiskrug Shipyard, ADM Kiel (Civilian Shipbuilding assets of HDW) & Hellenic Shipyards SA.

CMN is able to build or refit vessels up to 70m. The construction is done entirely under sheltered halls (48,000 square metres of covered facilities), on a total surface of 110,000 square metres. The site has significantly sized building sheds, one of 161m x 22M, and another of 80m x 22m.
 
The vessels are launched by:
a slipway for yachts under 700 tons
a 3000 tonne Syncrolift (lift area of 32m x 90m)

Before becoming a part of Abu Dhabi Mar group holding in 2007, Iskandar Safa was the sole owner of CMN.

See also
Abu dhabi MAR
Nobiskrug
Hellenic Shipyards Co.

References

External links

Official
 CMN Yachts
 CMN Naval ships

Shipbuilding companies of France